Tamia is the debut studio album by Canadian recording artist Tamia. It was released on April 14, 1998 on Quincy Jones's Qwest Records, while distribution was handled through Warner Bros. Recorded after the release of her Grammy Award-nominated collaborations with Jones and the single "Missing You", her contribution to the soundtrack of the 1996 motion picture Set It Off, Tamia worked with a plethora of producers on her debut, including Jermaine Dupri, Tim & Bob, Mario Winans, J-Dub, Keith Crouch, and Christopher "Tricky" Stewart, many of which would become frequent producers on subsequent projects.

Upon its release, Tamia received a mixed to positive reception by critics, who complimented Tamia's vocal performance and the progression from her earlier recordings but found the material uneven. It debuted and peaked at number sixty-seven on the Billboard 200 chart and entered the top twenty of the Top R&B/Hip-Hop Albums chart. Five singles were released from the album. "Imagination" was chosen as the album's lead single, reaching the top 20 in Canada and top forty in both the United States and New Zealand. The album's second single produced by Tim & Bob called "So into You" was well-received and charted even higher. A remake of "Careless Whisper" was released as the album's fourth single in Japan. A critical success, Tamia garnered the singer two Juno Award nominations for Best New Solo Artist and R&B/Soul Recording of the Year at the 1999 award ceremony.

Background
After dominating local talent competitions through her teenage years, in 1994, Windsor native Tamia performed at a multiple sclerosis benefit in Aspen, Colorado when she met music manager, Lionel Richie's ex-wife Brenda Richie, who was cosponsoring the event and introduced herself to Tamia after the show. A few months later, Tamia, who was being courted by Warner Bros. Records at the time, called Richie to say that she was coming to Los Angeles for a photo session, resulting in her lasting stay and a management deal with Richie. Weeks later, Richie arranged for her to perform at a star-studded party that she held for singer Luther Vandross. Her performance reportedly impressed all in attendance, including veteran producer Quincy Jones, who later offered her the chance to appear on his album Q's Jook Joint (1995).

Overwhelmed by his offer, Tamia recorded vocals for "You Put a Move on My Heart", which Jones later selected as the album's first single. A moderate commercial success, the collaboration earned acclaim from critics; it was later nominated for a Grammy Award along with their second collaboration "Slow Jams" and "Missing You", a song she recorded with Brandy, Gladys Knight, and Chaka Khan for the soundtrack of the 1996 motion picture Set It Off. All three track reached the top twenty on Billboards Hot R&B Singles chart and gained Tamia additional recognition with nominations from the Soul Train Music Awards and the NAACP Image Awards. Following this, Jones signed her his label Qwest Records, a joint venture with Warner Bros., and enlisted the services of several producers to work on her debut self-titled album. Recording was reportedly intermitted when Tamia filmed the role of Sheri Silver in Speed 2: Cruise Control, playing the part of a featured vocalist at the dinner theatre aboard the luxury cruise ship.

Release and reception

Tamia earned generally mixed to positive reviews from critics. Leo Stanley of AllMusic remarked that the album "is an appealingly stylish collection of contemporary urban soul", while also stating that "it suffers from some uneven material". He rated the album three out of five stars. Cherie Saunders from Vibe found that "the disc is a deliberate attempt – and successful one – to free Tamia from the steely adult-contemporary cage". Impressed with the up-tempo songs on the album, she however found that Tamias "strength clearly lies with ballads", concluding that "despite some inconsistency, Tamia's shining vocal skills prove that she won't get pushed around by anyone on today's music playground". In his review for Billboard, Paul Verna wrote that Tamia "excels at ballad and midtempo tracks such as "So into You", "Falling for You", and "Rain on Me". He was less impressed with lead single "Imagination", which he criticized for Jermaine Dupri's unsuitable guest rap and a lack of "vocal punch".

Upon its release, Tamia debuted and peaked at sixty-seven on the US Billboard 200 and reached the eighteenth spot on Billboards Top R&B/Hip-Hop Albums chart. In total, the album sold 416,000 copies in the United States, and finished sixty-second on Billboards Top R&B/Hip-Hop Albums year-end chart in 1998. In Japan, Tamia was certified gold by the Recording Industry Association of Japan (RIAJ) in June 1998 for more than 100,000 copies shipped to stores.  Five singles were released from the album, including "Imagination" and "So into You" both of which reached the top forty of the US Billboard Hot 100. A critical success, Tamia garnered the singer two Juno Award nominations for Best New Solo Artist and R&B/Soul Recording of the Year at the 1999 award ceremony.

Track listing

Notes and sample credits
"Imagination" contains a sample of "I Want You Back" performed by The Jackson 5.
"So Into You" contains a sample of "Say Yeah" performed by The Commodores.
"Falling For You" contains a sample of "Best of My Love" performed by The Emotions.
"Careless Whisper" is a cover of George Michael's "Careless Whisper".
"You Put a Move on My Heart" is a cover of Mica Paris's "You Put a Move on My Heart".

Personnel 
Performance credits

 Tamia Washington  – vocals, background vocals
 Siedah Garrett – background vocals
 Marc Nelson – background vocals
 Alex Brown – background vocals
 Bridgette Bryant – background vocals
 Gordon Chambers – background vocals
 Jermaine Dupri – background vocals, rap

 Manuel Seal Jr. – background vocals
 Mario Winans – background vocals
 Terrell Carter – background vocals
 Liza Broome – background vocals
 Pamela Cork – background vocals
 Chelle Davis – background vocals
 Tanya Smith – background vocals

Instruments

 Gerald Albright – saxophone
 Pete Christlieb – saxophone
 Tom Scott – saxophone
 Michael Thompson – guitar
 Alex Al – bass
 George Bohannon – trombone
 Oscar Brashear – trumpet
 Tim Kelley - keyboards, drum programming, bass
 Ray Brown – trumpet
 Jeff Clayton – saxophone
 John Clayton – conductor
 Keith Crouch – multi instruments
 Ronnie Garrett – bass
 Gary Grant – trumpet
 Erik Hanson – synthesizer
 Jerry Hey – trumpet
 Paul Jackson Jr. – guitar

 Charles Loper – trombone
 Jack Nimitz – saxophone
 Greg Phillinganes – keyboards
 Bob Robinson – piano
 John "J.R." Robinson – drums
 Daryl Simmons – percussion, piano, keyboards
 John Jubu Smith – guitar
 Neil Stubenhaus – bass
 Rod Temperton – keyboards
 Snooky Young – trumpet
 Ralph Stacy – bass
 William Frank "Bill" Reichenbach Jr. – trombone
 Christopher "Tricky" Stewart – keyboards
 Reggie C. Young – trombone
 Steven Meeder – drums
 Fred Jackson Jr. – saxophone

Technical and production

 Quincy Jones – producer, executive producer
 Marc Nelson – vocal arrangements
 Bob Brown – engineer
 Paul D. Allen – engineer
 Francis Buckley – engineer
 Gordon Chambers – vocal arrangements
 John Clayton – arranger
 Keith Crouch – arranger, producer, vocal arrangements
 Jermaine Dupri – producer
 Erik Hanson – drum programming
 Tim Kelley – composer, all programming, arranger, vocal arrangements, producer
 Thom "TK" Kidd – engineer
 Herb Powers – mastering
 Brenda Richie – executive producer
 Bob Robinson – producer
 Manuel Seal – producer
 Jon-John Robinson – producer

 Daryl Simmons – producer, drum programming
 Tamia Washington – executive producer
 Phil Tan – engineer
 Rod Temperton – arranger
 Mario Winans – programming, producer
 Tim Shider – producer
 Stevie J – producer
 Mauricio Iragorri – engineer
 Christopher "Tricky" Stewart – composer, programming, producer, engineer
 Stephanie Gylden – engineer
 Mark D. Persaud – associate executive producer
 J-Dub – producer
 Samuel J. Sapp – producer
 Ian Alexander – executive producer
 Tom Brown – engineer
 Jay Brown – associate executive producer

Charts

Weekly charts

Year-end charts

Certifications

References

External links
 Tamia at Discogs

1998 debut albums
Albums produced by Jermaine Dupri
Albums produced by Tim & Bob
Albums produced by Quincy Jones
Albums produced by Tricky Stewart
Qwest Records albums
Tamia albums
Warner Records albums